Green Mound is one of the largest Pre-Columbian shell mounds, or shell middens, in the United States. Located in Ponce Inlet, Florida, the peak of the mound is the highest elevation in the small city.  While it once stood at forty feet above sea level, a combination of public works projects on the nearby roads and natural erosion have reduced the height of the mound by about 10 feet.  
 
The mound was built by Native Americans of the late St. Johns II cultural period, as indicated by the finding of pre-Columbian "chalky ware" ceramics dating to later than 800 AD. These overlie earlier relics of the St. Johns I cultural period, the cultural period following the Archaic period.  The St. Johns period was characterized by the introduction of mound-building and a more sedentary, rather than nomadic, lifestyle.  The natives who once lived at this location were closely tied to both the nearby Atlantic Ocean and the resource-rich saltwater estuaries of the Halifax River immediately west of the mound. The mound formed from a combination of discarded oyster shells, clam shells, and other debris.

Whether or not the shell heaps scattered in coastal and riparian locations throughout Florida were natural deposits or of human origin remained a matter of debate in the mid-19th century, although Daniel Brinton had come to the conclusion by 1859 that the shell mounds on the east coast of Florida were the waste heaps of aboriginal groups that had accumulated over centuries. Initial studies of the Green Mound area were conducted in the early to mid-1940s by archeologist Dr. John Griffin, who found that the mound was in fact inhabited by its builders and their subsequent generations.  Later excavation revealed multiple layers of clay floors, remnants of structural components such as postholes, and evidence of ash, fire pits and hearths at the site.  It is thought that the dwellings that sat upon the mound were constructed of materials such as palmetto limbs and other local forms of timber such as oak.  It is also inferred that due to the social structure that existed at the time, the inhabitation of the mound's top was reserved for the highest-ranking members (elites) of the community.  The most likely inhabitants of these prime locations on top of the mound would have been tribal chiefs and religious leaders.  Depending on their social status, other members of the community would have lived in areas closer to ground level.

The mound was listed on the National Register of Historic Places in 2020.

Gallery

References

External links

 Green Mound

Shell middens in Florida
Archaeological sites in Florida
Geography of Volusia County, Florida
Former populated places in Florida
Archaeological sites on the National Register of Historic Places in Florida
Former populated places in Volusia County, Florida
Mounds in Florida
National Register of Historic Places in Volusia County, Florida